DSB class MZ was a series of 61 diesel-electric locomotives operated by Danske Statsbaner. They were built by NOHAB between 1967 and 1978 under licence from General Motors EMD with subcontractors Thrige-Titan (traction motors) and Frichs (chassis, bodywork). There were four series of the locomotive built, designated I - IV.

Twenty were sold to Railion Denmark in 2001, two were sold to Spain's COMSA Rail Transport in 2004, and 16 of the III series were exported to Australia in the late 2000s. As of 2010 most of the remainder of the class are divided between various Danish, Swedish and Norwegian companies. In Sweden the locomotives have received the designation TMZ.

Sub-series

MZ I
Ten units of the first series were built between 1967 and 1969, each costing DKK ~2.4 million. One is kept by the Danish Railway Museum (MZ 1401), while the rest were sold to various Swedish operators between 2002 and 2006 including three to Motala Verkstad, two to Svensk Tågteknik (STT), and single units to TÅGAB, Inlandsgods, BK Tåg and Three T AB.

MZ II
Sixteen units of the second series were built in 1970. They have a similar appearance and many of the same characteristics as the I-series.

Seven units were sold to Railion Denmark in 2001. Most locomotives were sold to various Swedish and Norwegian operators between 2003 and 2006 including two units each to BK Tåg, TÅGAB and the Norwegian National Rail Administration (Jernbaneverket), and single units to Motala Verkstad and Svensk Tågteknik AB. Locomotive number MZ 1425 has been rented to Railiom between 2001 and 2003 and in 2004 was equipped with automatic coupling for hauling of IC4 multiple unit trains. As for 2015, 1425 were sold to Svensk Tågkraft making the 2nd series the only series not to exist in Denmark anymore.

MZ III
Twenty units of the third series were built between 1972 and 1974 at a cost of DKK ~3.75 million each. They have a slightly different appearance and were equipped with more powerful engines (20-cylinder version) and higher top speed.

Two units were sold to Comsa of Spain in 2004.  Two were sold to BLDX of Denmark in 2008.

Sixteen were sold to Australian operator Independent Rail of Australia (IRA) in 2006 having been in store for some years. All were overhauled in Copenhagen before being exported. They were shipped between 2006 and 2008. The last batch of six were damaged in transit off Bermuda when the MV Emmagracht encountered rough seas. All were off-loaded in Savannah, Georgia to be cleaned of oil contamination. Upon arriving in Australia, 1441 and 1444 were declared write-offs and scrapped at Bradken's Braemar facility in 2010.

After being regeared with a top speed of 105 km/h, the remainder entered service retaining their existing numbers. All were included in the purchase of the IRA business by Qube Logistics. In December 2011 1438 incurred major damage at Port Botany and was later scrapped. Having been in store at Port Botany for some period, 1446 moved to Cardiff Locomotive Workshops in 2016.

As for 2018, there is only one unit of the 3rd series remaining in Denmark.

MZ IV
Fifteen units of the fourth series were built between 1977 and 1978. It has the same performance as the MZ III, but a slightly different appearance (narrower front window).

Two units were sold to TÅGAB of Sweden in 2006, scrapped in 2015, five to Baneservice, Norway in 2009, now owned by NRFAB in Sweden. The remainder have been in service with Railion Denmark (Now DB Cargo Scandinavia) since 2001, as for 2018, 6 of the MZ IV remains in service in Denmark. 2 units were sold 2015 to NRFAB in Sweden.

Preservation
MZ 1401 is part of the collection of the Danish Railway Museum.

See also
RENFE Class 333, the original class 333s were built to the same NOHAB design as the DSB MZ

References

Sources
Individual locomotive histories

History and technical

Further reading
Former DSB Class MZ: Still Active Today's Railways Europe issue 273 September 2018 pages 22–26

External links

Images

Videos

Co′Co′ locomotives
Diesel-electric locomotives of Australia
Diesel-electric locomotives of Denmark
Diesel-electric locomotives of Sweden
MZ
NOHAB locomotives
Railway locomotives introduced in 1967
Standard gauge locomotives of Denmark
Freight locomotives
Passenger locomotives
Standard gauge locomotives of Australia